The Trinidad and Tobago women's national football team is commonly known in their country as the Women Soca Warriors. They are one of the top women's national football teams in the Caribbean region along with Jamaica and Haiti.

Trinidad & Tobago women's national football team is currently coached by Trinbagonian Kenwayne Jones, who was appointed, initially as an interim, on 18 October 2021.

Team image

Home stadium
The national team plays their home games generally in one of three stadium in the country. Games of significant importance are usually played at the Hasely Crawford Stadium. However, many World Cup qualification matches have been played at the Queen's Park Oval, a multipurpose, but primarily cricket, stadium. Low profile games, such as international friendlies against other islands in the Caribbean, are played at the Marvin Lee Stadium.

Results and fixtures

The following is a list of match results in the last 12 months, as well as any future matches that have been scheduled.

Legend

2021

2022

Coaching staff

Current coaching staff

Players

Current squad
 The following players were called up for the matches against Nicaragua and Dominica on 17 and 20 February 2022, respectively.

Recent call-ups
The following players have been called up to a Trinidad and Tobago squad in the past 12 months.

DCL Player refused to join the team after the call-up.
INJ Player withdrew from the squad due to an injury.
PRE Preliminary squad.
RET Player has retired from international football.
SUS Suspended from the national team.

Competitive record

FIFA Women's World Cup

*Draws include knockout matches decided on penalty kicks.

Olympic Games

*Draws include knockout matches decided on penalty kicks.

CONCACAF W Championship
They are the only nation to appear in every CONCACAF Women's Championship.

*Draws include knockout matches decided on penalty kicks.

Pan American Games

*Draws include knockout matches decided on penalty kicks.

Central American and Caribbean Games

*Draws include knockout matches decided on penalty kicks.

CFU Women's Caribbean Cup

*Draws include knockout matches decided on penalty kicks.

Other tournaments

Torneio Internacional de Futebol Feminino

See also
Sport in Trinidad and Tobago
Football in Trinidad and Tobago
Women's football in Trinidad and Tobago
Trinidad and Tobago women's national under-20 football team
Trinidad and Tobago women's national under-17 football team
Trinidad and Tobago men's national football team

References

External links
Official website
FIFA profile